Ramsey Township may refer to the following townships in the United States:

 Ramsey Township, Fayette County, Illinois
 Ramsey Township, Kossuth County, Iowa

Township name disambiguation pages